Golshan is a village in Eshqabad Rural District, Miyan Jolgeh District, Nishapur County, Razavi Khorasan Province, Iran
. At the 2006 census, its population was 441, in 110 families.

References 

Populated places in Nishapur County